John A. Lynch Sr. (March 10, 1908 – March 3, 1978) was an American Democratic Party politician who served in the New Jersey Senate for 22 years, where he represented the 17th legislative District, and as mayor of New Brunswick, New Jersey, from 1951 to 1955.

Biography

Lynch was born in New Brunswick, New Jersey, on March 10, 1908, to John T. Lynch and Margaret Corrigan. After graduating from St. Peter the Apostle High School in New Brunswick in 1925, he entered Fordham University. He transferred to Fordham University School of Law, graduating in 1929 with a Bachelor of Laws degree. He was admitted to the New Jersey bar in October 1929.  He clerked with New Jersey Supreme Court Justice Peter F. Daly and became a trial lawyer in New Brunswick.

On October 13, 1934, Lynch married Evelyn Rooney, daughter of Joseph Rooney and Helen Ware. They had five children: Barbara Ann, John A. Lynch, Jr., William J., Mary-Lynn, and Gerald M. Lynch. John A. Lynch, Jr. would also serve as State Senator and Mayor of New Brunswick.

From 1935 to 1941 he served as police recorder of the city of New Brunswick. He then served as prosecutor of pleas for Middlesex County from 1941 to 1946. In 1946 he was elected to the New Brunswick Board of Commissioners, and then became mayor in 1951, serving until 1955.

In 1955 he was elected to the first of seven terms to the New Jersey Senate. In 1966 he was selected as Senate President, serving as Acting Governor in the absence of Governor Richard J. Hughes.

Lynch continued to serve in the Senate while suffering from cancer in the last four years of his life. He died at Whitestone Hospital in Queens, New York City, on March 3, 1978, a week before his 70th birthday.

Legacy
The John A. Lynch Sr. Memorial Bridge, spanning the Raritan River on Route 18, is named in his honor.

References

External links
John A. Lynch  at The Political Graveyard

1908 births
1978 deaths
Fordham University School of Law alumni
New Jersey lawyers
Mayors of New Brunswick, New Jersey
Democratic Party New Jersey state senators
Presidents of the New Jersey Senate
Politicians from Mercer County, New Jersey
20th-century American lawyers
20th-century American politicians